Beast Mode is a 2020 American comedy horror film directed by Chris W. Freeman and Spain Willingham and starring C. Thomas Howell, Leslie Easterbrook, Ray Wise, James Hong and James Duval.

Cast
C. Thomas Howell as Breen Nash
Leslie Easterbrook as Zelda Zine
Ray Wise as Trammel Steadfast
James Hong as Pish Rudabaker
James Duval as Huckle Saxton
Robert Costanzo as Chrome Mangle
Douglas Bennett as Ezequiel
Daz Crawford as Scram Putoff

Release
The film was released on DVD and Digital on December 1, 2020.

Reception
The film has a 63 percent rating on Rotten Tomatoes based on eight reviews.

Paul Grammatico of Dread Central awarded the film four stars out of five and wrote, "...an extreme b-movie feel which meshes well with its visual product.  There are good moments of gory horror mixed with campy comedy..."

Lorry Kikta of Film Threat rated the film an 8 out of 10 and wrote, "If you love a good, silly horror-comedy with a heart of gold, this is right up your alley, and you should check it out."

References

External links
 
 

2020s English-language films